Adams Township is a township in DeKalb County, Missouri, United States.

Adams Township was established in 1870, and most likely was named after President John Adams.

References

Townships in DeKalb County, Missouri
Townships in Missouri